Polly Porter is the name of:

Mary “Polly” Winearls Porter (1886-1980), English crystallographer and geologist
Mary G. "Polly" Porter (1884-1972), social worker, partner of Molly Dewson and friend of Eleanor Roosevelt